Sofia Arvidsson was the defending champion, but lost in the quarterfinals to Meilen Tu.

Venus Williams won in the final 6–1, 6–1, against Shahar Pe'er.

Seeds

  Shahar Pe'er (final)
  Tatiana Golovin (withdrew due to an upper respiratory infection)
  Marion Bartoli (first round)
  Samantha Stosur (quarterfinals, retired due to a viral illness)
  Nicole Pratt (second round)
  Shenay Perry (second round, retired due to a right knee injury)
  Venus Williams (champion)
  Jill Craybas (second round)
  Vania King (first round)

Draw

Finals

Top half

Bottom half

External links
Draw and Qualifying Draw

Singles
2007 WTA Tour